James Robertson (born 1958) is a Scottish writer who grew up in Bridge of Allan, Stirlingshire. He is the author of several short story and poetry collections, and has published seven novels: The Fanatic, Joseph Knight, The Testament of Gideon Mack, And the Land Lay Still, The Professor of Truth, and To Be Continued… and News of the Dead. The Testament of Gideon Mack was long-listed for the 2006 Man Booker Prize.

Robertson also runs an independent publishing company called Kettillonia, and is a co-founder (with Matthew Fitt and Susan Rennie) and general editor of the Scots language imprint Itchy Coo (produced by Black & White Publishing), which produces books in Scots for children and young people.

Early life

Educated at Glenalmond College and Edinburgh University, Robertson attained a PhD in history at Edinburgh on the novels of Walter Scott.  He also spent an exchange year at the University of Pennsylvania in Philadelphia.

Robertson worked in a variety of jobs after leaving university, mainly in the book trade. He was a publisher's sales rep and later worked for Waterstone's Booksellers, first as a bookseller in Edinburgh and later as assistant manager of the Glasgow branch.

Literature
Robertson became a full-time author in the early 1990s. From 1993 to 1995 he was the first writer in residence at Hugh MacDiarmid's house outside Biggar, Lanarkshire. Robertson had already been heavily influenced by MacDiarmid and MacDiarmid's Scots language poetry prior to this appointment. His early short stories and first novel used contemporary and historical life in Edinburgh as a key theme, drawing on his experience of living there intermittently during his PhD and during the later 1990s before moving to Fife, and subsequently Angus. Each of his three novels has been influenced to a degree by where he was living when he wrote them. Joseph Knight is based on the true story of a slave brought from the Caribbean to Scotland, and the novel revolves primarily around the cities of Dundee, near where Robertson was then living, and Edinburgh. The Testament of Gideon Mack, meanwhile, is set in a fictitious rural village that resembles the villages of eastern Scotland bordering the Highlands between Dundee and Aberdeen where Robertson currently lives. His novels, therefore, feature the Scottish urban and rural landscape as prevalently as Scottish history between the 17th and 20th centuries.

While Robertson's first two novels featured the Scottish past (The Fanatic merged a story of contemporary Scotland in the months surrounding the 1997 election with a story of Scotland in the 17th century, while Joseph Knight was purely historical) he is not a historical novelist, and Gideon Mack was set in Scotland between the 1950s and the present day.

In November 2004 Robertson was the first, and to date, only writer-in-residence at the newly opened Scottish Parliament building. The appointment was for three days only and was negotiated by Scottish Book Trust with the Parliament. On each day Robertson delivered a 'masterclass' on different aspects of the relationship between Scottish literature and politics. These later became three essays which were published, along with eleven sonnets reflecting his experience of the new building, in Voyage of Intent: Sonnets and Essays from the Scottish Parliament (Luath/Scottish Book Trust, 2005).

The other side of Robertson's career since circa 2000 has been Itchy Coo, a publisher of children's books in the Scots language. Initially funded by the Scottish Arts Council, Itchy Coo has proved to be a popular enterprise. Robertson's interest in and use of Scots also features heavily in his poetry and prose, and notably in his first two novels, which blend modern English with Scots. Katie’s Moose won the early years category in the Royal Mail Awards for Scottish Children's Books 2007.

In 2010 he became the first writer-in-residence at Edinburgh Napier University.

In 2011 Robertson contributed a short story "The Quaking of the Aspen" to an anthology supporting The Woodland Trust. The anthology - Why Willows Weep - has so far helped The Woodland Trust plant approximately 50,000 trees, and is to be re-released in paperback format in 2016.

Robertson's 365 Stories was published in 2014- a collection of stories that are each 365 words in length, written over the course of a year.

Personal life

Politically, Robertson has always been in favour of self-determination for Scotland. He was involved in the political magazine Radical Scotland in the 1980s.

Awards and recognition 
Robertson was awarded an honorary degree by The Open University at the degree ceremony in the Usher Hall, Edinburgh on 21 June 2014.

In October 2020, he won the Janet Paisley Services to Scots Award in the Scots Language Awards. In 2022 he won the Walter Scott Prize for News of the Dead.

Publications

Novels 
The Fanatic (Fourth Estate, 2000)
Joseph Knight (Fourth Estate, 2003)
The Testament of Gideon Mack (Hamish Hamilton, 2006)
 And the Land Lay Still (Hamish Hamilton, 2010)
The Professor of Truth (Hamish Hamilton, 2013)
To Be Continued… (Hamish Hamilton, 2016)
News of the Dead (Hamish Hamilton, 2021)

Non-Fiction 
Michael Marra: Arrest This Moment (Big Sky Press, 2017)

Short stories 
Close (Black and White Publishing, 1991)
The Ragged Man's Complaint (Black and White Publishing, 1993)
Republics of the Mind (Black and White Publishing, 2012)
365: Stories (Hamish Hamilton, 2014)

Poetry 
Sound-Shadow (Black and White Publishing, 1995)
I Dream of Alfred Hitchcock (Kettillonia pamphlet, 1999)
Stirling Sonnets (Kettillonia pamphlet, 2001)
Voyage of Intent: Sonnets and Essays from the Scottish Parliament (Scottish Book Trust and Luath Press, 2005)
Hem and Heid (Kettillonia pamphlet, 2009)

Children's books 

In Scots unless indicated.

A Scots Parliament (English, Itchy Coo, 2002)
Eck the Bee: A Scots Word Activity Book (Ann Matheson and James Robertson, Itchy Coo, 2002)
The Hoose o Haivers (Matthew Fitt, Susan Rennie and James Robertson,  Itchy Coo, 2002)
Tam O'Shanter's Big Night Oot: Wee Plays in Scots (edited by Robertson and Fitt, Itchy Coo, 2003)
King o the Midden: Manky Minging Rhymes in Scots (edited by Robertson and Fitt, Itchy Coo, 2003)  (also in a digest format, The Wee King o the Midden, Itchy Coo, 2008)
The Smoky Smirr O Rain: A Scots Anthology (edited by Robertson and Fitt, Itchy Coo, 2003)
A Moose in the Hoose: A Scots Counting Book (Robertson and Fitt, Itchy Coo, 2006)
Katie's Ferm: A Hide & Seek Book for Wee Folk (Robertson and Fitt, Itchy Coo, 2007)
Blethertoun Braes: More Manky Minging Rhymes in Scots (edited by Robertson and Fitt, Itchy Coo, 2007)
A Wee Book O Fairy Tales in Scots (Robertson and Fitt, Itchy Coo, 2007)
Rabbie's Rhymes: Robert Burns for Wee Folk (edited by Robertson and Fitt, Itchy Coo, 2008)
Katie's Moose: A Keek-a-boo Book for Wee Folk (Robertson and Fitt, Itchy Coo, 2008)
The Sleekit Mr Tod by Roald Dahl (Scots translation, Itchy Coo, 2008)
Winnie the Pooh by A. A. Milne (Scots translation, Itchy Coo, 2008)
Katie's Year: Aw the Months for Wee Folk (Itchy Coo, 2009)
Precious and the Puggies by Alexander McCall Smith (Scots translation, Itchy Coo, 2010)
The Hoose at Pooh's Neuk by A.A. Milne (Scots translation, Itchy Coo, 2010)
Katie's Zoo: A Day Oot for Wee Folk (Itchy Coo, 2010)
The Gruffalo in Scots by Julia Donaldson (Itchy Coo, 2012)
The Gruffalo's Wean by Julia Donaldson (Itchy Coo, 2013)
Room on the Broom in Scots by Julia Donaldson (Itchy Coo, 2014)
Whit the Clockleddy Heard by Julia Donaldson (Itchy Coo, 2015)
The Reiver Rat by Julia Donaldson (Itchy Coo, 2015)
The Troll and the Kist o Gowd by Julia Donaldson (Itchy Coo, 2016)
Paddington in Scots by Michael Bond (Itchy Coo, 2020)

Edited works 
My Schools and Schoolmasters by Hugh Miller (Black and White Publishing, 1993)
Scenes and Legends of the North of Scotland by Hugh Miller (Black and White Publishing, 1994)
A Tongue in yer Heid (Black and White Publishing, 1994)
Dictionary of Scottish Quotations (with Angela Cran) (Mainstream Publishing, 1996)
Selected Poems of Robert Fergusson (Birlinn, 2000)

Translations 

Fae the Flouers o Evil (Scots trans. Robertson of Baudelaire) (Kettillonia Pamphlet)
La A'Bhreitheanais or The Day o Judgment (Scots trans. Robertson of Dugald Buchanan) (Kettillonia Pamphlet)

Websites 
 scotgeog.com (A website spin-off from the Testament of Gideon Mack, 2006)

Essays 
 Story behind The Professor of Truth (Online Essay, 2013)

References

External links
 Itchy Coo, educational Scots language publisher for younger readers, co-founded by Robertson
 Kettillonia, independent publisher run by Robertson
 scotgeog.com, website authored by Robertson

1958 births
Living people
Scottish novelists
People from Bridge of Allan
Scottish poets
People educated at Glenalmond College
Alumni of the University of Edinburgh